Donald Charles Crombie  (born 5 July 1942) is an Australian film and television director and screenwriter.

Born in Brisbane, Crombie was educated at the Anglican Church Grammar School and studied at the National Institute of Dramatic Art.

Crombie started work at the Commonwealth Film Unit in 1963. He has directed feature films, telemovies, mini-series, drama series, documentaries and commercials, and has also written film and television scripts. Crombie has been a board member of the AWG, ASDACS and ASDA and the president of ASDA for over 5 years.

He is the father of costume and production designer Fiona Crombie.

Filmography

Feature films directed 

 The Choice (1971)
 Caddie (1976)
 The Irishman (1978) (also writer)
 Cathy's Child (1979)
 The Killing of Angel Street (1981)
 Kitty and the Bagman (1983)
 Playing Beatie Bow (1986)
 Rough Diamonds (1994) (also writer)
 Selkie (2000)

Television

 Do I Have to Kill My Child? (1976) (TV) (also writer)
 "Cyclone Tracy" (1986) TV mini-series
 The Heroes (1988) (TV)
 The Alien Years (1988) (TV)
 The Saint: Fear in Fun Park (1989) (TV)
 The River Kings (1991) TV mini-series
 Heroes II: The Return (1991) (TV)
 The Feds: Terror (1993) (TV)
 "Time Trax" (1993–1994)
 The Celluloid Heroes (1995) (TV)
 "Flipper" (1995–1997)
 "Tales of the South Seas" (1998) TV series
"McLeod's Daughters" (2001–2002)

Other
Aircraft at Work (1966) (documentary) (also writer)
Is Anybody Doing Anything About It? (1967) (short) (also writer)
Sailor (1968) (documentary)
Top End (1968) (documentary)
Our Land Australia (1972) (documentary) (also producer, co-writer)
 Who Killed Jenny Langby? (1974) (documentary) (also co-writer)
 Robbery Under Arms (1985) (cinema and a television mini-series release)

References

External links

1942 births
Living people
Australian film directors
Australian screenwriters
Australian film producers
People from Brisbane
Australian television directors
People educated at Anglican Church Grammar School
Members of the Order of Australia